Overruled! is a Canadian children's television sitcom about high school kids with problems, which are taken to Teen Court, hosted by Judge Tara; the series aired on Family Channel in Canada and Disney Channel in the United Kingdom. It premiered on July 10, 2009 in the United Kingdom and September 13, 2009 in Canada. In Canada, Family Channel premiered the show by airing episodes from the second season first. Then after the thirteenth episode of season 2, the channel ran all 13 episodes of season 1.

Plot
The show centers around Jared " The Coop" Cooper and his friends: Russell "Rusty" Dougal, an eccentric transfer student, Kaleigh Stewart, one of the lawyers at teen court, and Tara Bohun, the judge at teen court. When Teen Court is in session, Tara is the judge, Rusty is the court clerk, and Kaeligh and Coop are the lawyers. As the cases often involve all of them, they all have to stay fair in court despite their friendships and prejudices which usually leads to more problems.

Characters
 Jared "Coop" Cooper (Jacob Kraemer): Coop, 15, is a cool, fun, articulate charmer who never thought he'd voluntarily participate in any extracurricular activities that didn't involve his favourite pursuits: playing drums, sports and girls. But during his first week of tenth grade, Coop takes on one of the recently vacated lawyer positions in Banting High's teen court, and discovers his charm and confidence make him a natural for legal work. Through the series it is noticed Coop has a crush on Kaeleigh, but he decides not tell her his true feelings when she rejects Ronald and swears off boys. 
 Kaeleigh Stewart (Sally Taylor-Isherwood): In the courtroom, Kaeleigh, 15, is super-efficient and super-serious. Outside the courtroom, she likes to think she loosens up, but Coop would argue the contrary. Of course, when it comes to Kaleigh, Coop always argues the contrary. Kaeleigh loves her job as a lawyer because it's the one place she feels totally in control. She knows exactly what to do, what to say and how to act. Outside the courtroom she's just as confused about the rules of being a teenager as anyone. Through the series it is noticed Kaeleigh has a crush on Coop.
 Russell "Rusty" Dougal (Nick Spencer): Being the court clerk is serious business for Rusty, 15, who confidently bumbles his way through every court procedure. It's Rusty's job to make sure things run smoothly in the courtroom and, to everyone's surprise, he often succeeds. Rusty takes great pride in his court but once court is out of session he's just another awkward teenager in the hall. He is also known to be loyal, a popular quality for Scottish people.
 Tara Bohun (Jasmine Richards): Tara, 15, is Banting High's teen court happy-go-lucky judge. Though she may seem illogical and scatterbrained, her roundabout way of looking at things always leads to verdicts that are spot on. Speaking with Tara, you'd never know that her convoluted and bizarre logic would translate into courtroom decisions that actually show great insight and clarity, or that underneath her trendy clothes lurks a razor-sharp legal mind who calls things like she sees them.
 Linda Cooper (Tammy Isobell): Coop's mother who is just as normal as any mom. She and Gil, her husband, always want what's best for their kids.
 Gil Cooper (Tom Barnett): Coop's father who is a normal dad 
 Jordana 'Jordy' Cooper (Sara Waisglass): Jordy, Coop's little sister, likes to pick on her brother just like any sister. She is known to be really bright for her age but also has a good friendship with her peers. She is gifted. In one episode, Jordy was interested in a boy, but it is not known if she is really interested in other boys.

Production

Development
Shaftesbury Films sold the Overruled! to Family Channel in February 2008; the series was expected to produce 13-episodes for a late 2008 debut, but didn't air in Canada until 2010.

Filming
Riverdale Collegiate Institute in Toronto, Ontario is where the external shots of Banting High were taken.

Episodes

Series overview

Season 1 (2009)

Season 2 (2009)

International broadcast

Overruled! was expected to be picked up by Disney Channel in the United States, but the series never aired. It aired in Spain, The Netherlands and Belgium on Disney Channel Europe. The series also aired in Poland on ZigZap, and in Portugal on Panda Biggs.

References

External links
 

2000s Canadian high school television series
2000s Canadian teen sitcoms
2009 Canadian television series debuts
2009 Canadian television series endings
Family Channel (Canadian TV network) original programming
English-language television shows
Disney Channel (British and Irish TV channel) original programming
Television series about families
Television series about teenagers
Television shows filmed in Toronto
Television series by Shaftesbury Films